Ezequiel Edison Rescaldani (born 11 June 1992) is an Argentine footballer  play for  Deportivo moron.

Club career

Vélez Sarsfield
Rescaldani played youth football in hometown's Sarmiento de Leones, and after brief periods with Instituto and Belgrano, he had a trial with Vélez Sarsfield in August 2009, and subsequently signed a deal with the club.

Rescaldani played his first match as a professional on 24 September 2010, coming on as a substitute in a 3–0 win over Olimpo, in the 2010 Apertura. He appeared in three further matches in the campaign.

On 16 March 2012, Rescaldani joined Quilmes on loan until the end of the season. He featured regularly for the side, and scored his first professional goal on 16 June, netting the third of a 4–0 home routing over Gimnasia Jujuy.

Rescaldani returned to Vélez in July.

Málaga
On 31 January 2014, Rescaldani signed a six-month deal with La Liga side Málaga CF, with an option for a further four years. He made his debut in the competition on 31 March, replacing Francisco Portillo in a 2–1 win at Real Betis.

On 19 June 2015 Rescaldani was loaned to Mexican club Puebla, in a season-long deal.

Honours
Vélez Sarsfield
Argentine Primera División (2): 2011 Clausura, 2012 Inicial

Puebla
Supercopa MX: 2015

Atletico Nacional
CONMEBOL: 2016 Copa Libertadores
Copa Colombia: 2016

References

External links

Living people
1992 births
Sportspeople from Córdoba Province, Argentina
Argentine footballers
Argentine expatriate footballers
Association football forwards
Argentine Primera División players
Primera Nacional players
Club Atlético Vélez Sarsfield footballers
Quilmes Atlético Club footballers
Talleres de Córdoba footballers
La Liga players
Segunda División players
Málaga CF players
SD Huesca footballers
Atlético Nacional footballers
Club Atlético Patronato footballers
Arsenal de Sarandí footballers
San Martín de San Juan footballers
Santiago Wanderers footballers
Liga MX players
Club Puebla players
Categoría Primera A players
Primera B de Chile players
Argentine expatriate sportspeople in Chile
Argentine expatriate sportspeople in Spain
Argentine expatriate sportspeople in Mexico
Argentine expatriate sportspeople in Colombia
Expatriate footballers in Chile
Expatriate footballers in Spain
Expatriate footballers in Mexico
Expatriate footballers in Colombia